Martin Rønning Ovenstad (born 18 April 1994) is a free agent Norwegian footballer, who plays for Mjøndalen.

Rønning Ovenstad made his debut for Mjøndalen in the 1–3 loss against Moss on 25 April 2010, just one week after his 16th birthday.

Two years later, he signed for Strømsgodset, and made his debut in the 4–0 win against Hønefoss on 30 June 2012. He was part of the 2013 Tippeligaen title winning squad, playing 13 league matches.

In July 2014, he was diagnosed with mononucleosis and was expected to miss the rest of the 2014 season. However, he made a quick recovery, and came on as a substitute in the 25th round 2–1 win against Viking, on 28 September the same year.

In 2018 he spent time on loan at Stabæk, without making a mark. Shortly after his loan return his contract was terminated, so he decided to return to Strømsgodset on a three-month contract. The contract was later lengthened until the end of the 2019 season, after which he was released.

Career statistics

Honours

Club

Strømsgodset:
 Tippeligaen: 2013

References

1994 births
Living people
Norwegian footballers
Norwegian expatriate footballers
Sportspeople from Drammen
Norway youth international footballers
Association football midfielders
Mjøndalen IF players
Strømsgodset Toppfotball players
SK Sturm Graz players
Stabæk Fotball players
Norwegian First Division players
Eliteserien players
Expatriate footballers in Austria
Norwegian expatriate sportspeople in Austria